Mary Ann MacKenzie (November 22, 1925 – December 24, 1997) was a politician in the American state of Florida. She served in the Florida House of Representatives from 1963 to 1966, representing Dade County. She later was a judge on the Eleventh Judicial Circuit Court of Florida.

References

1925 births
1997 deaths
Members of the Florida House of Representatives
Women state legislators in Florida
20th-century American politicians
20th-century American women
20th-century American women politicians